Bashir Saghir Hawadi (born 1941), also transliterated as Hawady or Houadi, is a Libyan major general who served under Muammar Gaddafi. He was among the twelve original members of the Libyan Revolutionary Command Council, the chief judge of the Libyan People's Court, and the General Secretary of the Arab Socialist Union.

Biography 

A native of Waddan, Hawadi was a classmate of Muammar Gaddafi at the Benghazi Military University Academy. He and Awad Ali Hamza (born 1943) were in the political study cell Gaddafi formed at the school.

Hawadi played a key role in the 1969 Libyan coup d'état that brought Gaddafi to power. After the successful coup, he was among the twelve "free officers" named to the Libyan Revolutionary Command Council (RCC). He also served as chief judge of the Libyan People's Court in 1970.

In June 1971, Gaddafi founded the a vanguard party named Arab Socialist Union to mobilize revolutionary enthusiasm and support of the masses. Hawadi was named General Secretary of the Party while Gaddafi was chairman. He later served as Minister of Religious Affairs.

In August 1975, Hawadi and Hamza sided with Planning Minister and fellow RCC member Umar Muhayshi in the latter's dispute with Gaddafi. Gaddafi accused them of plotting a coup. Hawadi and Hamza were arrested; Muhayshi and Abdul Moniem al-Taher el-Huny fled. The aborted coup hastened the end of the RCC. In the ensuing purge, most of the conspirators were executed in March 1976. Hawadi apparently survived the purge.

It was unclear how long Hawadi was imprisoned, but it appeared he was eventually forgiven by Gaddafi and led a quiet life out of politics. When the First Libyan Civil War broke out in 2011, Hawadi was summoned by Gaddafi and he appeared on Libyan TV in his military uniform on 26 May 2011 to praise Gaddafi.  In September 2011, after the Battle of Tripoli, Hawadi was arrested by rebel forces and imprisoned in Misrata. Hawadi claimed Gaddafi had threatened to kill him and wipe his hometown of Waddan off the map if he had refused to help Gaddafi mobilize public support and "calm the people of Libya." Hawadi also claimed that he had no military or political role in a long time due to his poor relationship with Gaddafi and that he had surrendered to the National Transitional Council after being guaranteed safety. He stated that he knew nothing about Gaddafi's whereabouts as he had last seen him on 25 May 2011.

References

Works cited
 
 
 
 
 

Libyan generals
People of the First Libyan Civil War